i Sebastiani is a Commedia dell'Arte theatre troupe formed in 1990 by Jeff Hatalsky. To the present day, i Sebastiani has performed for thousands of fans across the United States and Canada. The company has travelled as far as Montreal to the north, Miami to the south, and Texas to the west, performing more than 100 different improvisational scenarios.

i Sebastiani presently operates out of Boston, MA. They specialize in performances for educational institutions, historical organizations, and the general public.
The troupe frequently performs to packed crowds at the Charles River Museum of Industry in Waltham, MA. A portion of the proceeds from recent shows have gone towards the repair of flooding damage. The damage was incurred by the Museum during historic rainfall in spring of 2010, when the Charles River reached a century high-water level.

History
i Sebastiani was founded on June 4, 1990, as a splinter organization of the Society for Creative Anachronism (SCA). Founder Jeff Hatalsky's stated objective was to drive the group towards greater authenticity.
In September 2001, i Sebastiani attended the Austin Commedia dell'Arte Festival in Austin Texas, where they were met with acclaim. From 1991 through September 2001, the Troupe had performed each Commedia dell'Arte scenario only once, but as demand for Commedia built, i Sebastiani began to perform multiple times with each scenario.

In October 1996, Jeff Hatalsky left the troupe, and it began a period of attempted democracy. This mode of organization imposed natural limitations, and through reform Alex Newman stepped beyond his role as coordinator to become the troupe's new Capocomico (manager).
In October 2002, the troupe expanded beyond SCA events and began to perform for the general public.

i Sebastiani's Florida debut came at the Miami Improv Festival in 2006. Octavio Roca of the Miami New Times commented of the troupe that:

Historical Authenticity
Unlike many modern Commedia troupes, i Sebastiani attempts to make their performances authentic to the original 16th century Commedia time period. To maintain integrity of the historical genre, the troupe's scenarios are usually recreations of recorded historical scenarios. The published works of the 16th-century Commedia playwright Flaminio Scala provide one of the key sources for this material. Scenarios which are not adapted from the original time period are written in adherence to the maxims of historical scenarios and attempt to authentically portray the genre.

iSebastiani's props are also created for time-period accuracy using similar materials & methods. The making of Commedia's signature leather masks is a specialty studied by several troupe members for the purpose of making authentic costumes.

Because of Commedia's influence on western theatre, many elements of Commedia are broadly recognizable by modern audiences. The continuing popularity of Shakespeare, who adopted many characters & scenarios from Commedia, has also preserved many close descendants of the genre. Bill Eisele of South End News describes Commedia dell'Arte's 'comedy of errors' in regards to i Sebastiani's performance of The Twin Captains:

See also
 Commedia dell'arte
 Masks in theatre
 Well-known Commedia archetypes Pantalone, Arlecchino, Il Capitano, Il Dottore

References

External links
 Official website for the Charles River Museum of Industry and Innovation

Bibliography

Further reading
 Chaffee, Judith An annotated bibliography  from Judith Chaffee.
 Darius, Adam. The Commedia Dell' Arte (1996) Kolesnik Production OY, Helsinki. 
 DelPiano, Roberto La Commedia dell'Arte 2007. Retrieved 2009-07-09.
 Grantham, Barry Playing Commedia, Nick Hern Books, London, 2000. 
 Grantham, Barry Commedia Plays: Scenarios – Scripts – Lazzi, Nick Hern Books, London, 2006. 
Green, Martin and John Swan. The Triumph of Pierrot: The Commedia dell'Arte and the Modern Imagination. University Park, PA: Pennsylvania State University (1993). 
Katritzky, M.A.The Art of Commedia: A Study in the Commedia dell'Arte 1560–1620 with Special Reference to the Visual Records. New York: Editions Rodopi (2006). 
Palleschi, Marino. The Commedia dell'Arte:  Its Origins, Development & Influence on the Ballet. Auguste Vestris (2005)
Puppa, Paolo A History of Italian Theatre. Eds. Joseph Farrell. Cambridge University Press. 2006. 

Scala, Flaminio (1611) Il Teatro Delle Favole Rappresentative (online pdf available at Bavarian State Library website). Translated into English by Henry F. Salerno in 1967 as Scenarios of the Commedia dell'Arte. New Italian edition cured by F.Mariotti (1976). New partial translation (30 scenarios out of 50) by Richard Andrews (2008) The Commedia dell'Arte of Flamino Scala, A Translation and Analysis of Scenarios Published by: Scarecrow Press.

Commedia dell'arte